Streitmühlbach is a river of Bavaria, Germany. It flows into the White Main in Himmelkron.

See also
List of rivers of Bavaria

Rivers of Bavaria
Kulmbach (district)
Rivers of Germany